Youssef El Akchaoui (born 18 February 1981) is a Moroccan former professional footballer. He played as a left back.

Club career
Having grown as a player at Excelsior, he joined ADO Den Haag in 2003 on a free transfer, and in the summer 2006, he signed a three-year deal with Eredivisie side NEC Nijmegen. On 20 January 2010, he was loaned to FC Augsburg for the remainder of the season.

International career
He made his first cap for Morocco in the friendly match against Benin on 20 August 2008.

References

External links
 

1981 births
Living people
Association football fullbacks
Dutch footballers
Riffian people
Dutch sportspeople of Moroccan descent
Moroccan expatriate sportspeople in Germany
Morocco international footballers
Moroccan expatriate footballers
Moroccan footballers
Eredivisie players
Eerste Divisie players
Derde Divisie players
2. Bundesliga players
Excelsior Rotterdam players
ADO Den Haag players
NEC Nijmegen players
1. FC Union Berlin players
FC Augsburg players
SC Heerenveen players
VVV-Venlo players
NAC Breda players
Expatriate footballers in Germany
Footballers from Dordrecht